William of Malines (or William of Messines) (died 1145/6) was a Flemish priest who was the Prior of the Church of the Holy Sepulchre from 1127 to 1130 and was then Latin Patriarch of Jerusalem from 1130 until his death. He is sometimes called William I to distinguish him from William of Agen, second patriarch of that name, but he was the second William to serve as prior of the Holy Sepulchre after William the Englishman.

William of Tyre described William of Mesines as a man of "praiseworthy habits".  As patriarch, he was an important supporter of Queen Melisende and is described as a man capable yet pliable. He received a letter from Bernard of Clairvaux urging him to support the Knights Templar, who had received their papal privileges at the same time as William's embassy to Rome. William took the initiative in constructing a castle, the "Castrum Arnaldi" (or Chastel Arnoul) at Yalo, to guard the road between Jerusalem and Jaffa in 1132–33, along with some citizens. It was later a Templar stronghold. 

In 1139 Patriarch William was displeased by the actions of Archbishop Fulcher of Tyre (of Angoulême), who travelled to Rome to receive his pallium from Pope Honorius II and protest the division of his archdiocese into two ecclesiastical territories: the northern suffragans were under the authority of the Latin patriarch of Antioch and only the southern sees remained under Fulcher's control.  Perhaps fearing that Fulcher would try to remove his entire archdiocese to the Principality of Antioch (so that he might exercise control over it all as archbishop), William took direct control over the southern sees of Tyre in Fulcher's absence,  for William would not allow the archbishop of Tyre, whose archdiocese lay within the boundaries of the Kingdom of Jerusalem and his patriarchate, to become the subject of another.

See also

Notes

1140s deaths
Latin Patriarchs of Jerusalem
Year of birth unknown
12th-century people of the Kingdom of Jerusalem
Flemish priests
12th-century Roman Catholic archbishops in the Kingdom of Jerusalem